is a Japanese football player. He plays for Vegalta Sendai.

Club statistics
Updated to 17 November 2022.

References

External links

Profile at Ventforet Kofu

1994 births
Living people
Meiji University alumni
Association football people from Chiba Prefecture
Japanese footballers
J1 League players
J2 League players
Ventforet Kofu players
Oita Trinita players
Association football defenders